The West Nova Scotia Regiment is a line infantry regiment of the Canadian Army, part of the Primary Reserve, and is part of the 5th Canadian Division's 36 Canadian Brigade Group. The regiment recruits volunteers from the South-Western part of the province of Nova Scotia and has its headquarters at LFAATC Aldershot, near the community of Aldershot, Nova Scotia.

Lineage

The West Nova Scotia Regiment
Originated 8 October 1869 in Paradise, Nova Scotia, as The First Regiment of Annapolis County Volunteers
Redesignated 5 November 1869 as 69th The 1st Regiment of Annapolis County
Amalgamated 1 September 1898 with The 72nd or Second Annapolis Battalion of Volunteer Militia and redesignated as the 69th "Annapolis" Battalion of Infantry
Redesignated 8 May 1900 as the 69th Annapolis Regiment
Redesignated 29 March 1920 as The Annapolis Regiment
Amalgamated 15 December 1936 with The Lunenburg Regiment and redesignated The West Nova Scotia Regiment
Redesignated 7 November 1940 as the 2nd (Reserve) Battalion, The West Nova Scotia Regiment
Redesignated 1 November 1945 as The West Nova Scotia Regiment
Redesignated 1 October 1954 as The West Nova Scotia Regiment (Machine Gun)
Redesignated 11 April 1958 as The West Nova Scotia Regiment

72nd or Second Annapolis Battalion of Volunteer Militia
Originated 14 January 1870 in Wilmot, Nova Scotia, as The 72nd or Second Annapolis Battalion of Volunteer Militia
Amalgamated 1 September 1898 with the 69th The 1st Regiment of Annapolis County

The Lunenburg Regiment
Originated 12 August 1870 in Lunenburg, Nova Scotia, as the 75th Lunenburg Battalion of Infantry
Redesignated 8 May 1900 as the 75th Lunenburg Regiment
Redesignated 29 March 1920 as The Lunenburg Regiment
Amalgamated 15 December 1936 with The Annapolis Regiment

Chart

Perpetuations

War Of 1812
1st Battalion, East Annapolis Regiment
2nd Battalion, East Annapolis Regiment
1st Battalion, King's County Regiment
2nd Battalion, King's County Regiment
1st Battalion, West Annapolis Regiment
2nd Battalion, West Annapolis Regiment

The Great War
112th Battalion (Nova Scotia), CEF
219th Highland Battalion (Nova Scotia), CEF

Operational history

The Great War
Details of the 69th Annapolis Regiment and 75th Lunenburg Regiment were placed called out on active service on 6 August 1914 for local protection duties.

The 112th Battalion (Nova Scotia), CEF was authorized on 22 December 1915 and embarked for Great Britain on 23 July 1916. There it provided reinforcements for the Canadian Corps in the field until 7 January 1917, when its personnel were absorbed by the 26th Reserve Battalion, CEF. The battalion was subsequently disbanded on 15 August 1918.

The 219th Highland Battalion (Nova Scotia), CEF was authorized on 15 July 1916 and embarked for Great Britain on 12 October 1916. There it provided reinforcements for the Canadian Corps in the field until 23 January 1917, when its personnel were absorbed by the 17th Reserve Battalion, CEF. The battalion was subsequently disbanded on 15 September 1917.

The Second World War
The regiment mobilized as The West Nova Scotia Regiment, CASF for active service on 1 September 1939. The unit then embarked on MS Chrobry for Great Britain on 21 December 1939 arriving in Gourock, Scotland on 29 December 1939. The unit arrived by train  from Scotland in the Farnborough / Cove area of Surrey on New Year's Day 1940 and were billeted at Guillemont Barracks. The unit was redesignated as the 1st Battalion, The West Nova Scotia Regiment, CASF on 7 November 1940. It landed in Sicily on 10 July 1943, and in Italy on 3 September 1943, as part of the 3rd Infantry Brigade, 1st Canadian Infantry Division. On 19 March 1945, the battalion moved with the I Canadian Corps to North West Europe, where it fought until the end of the war. The  overseas battalion was disbanded on 15 October 1945.

On 1 June 1945, a second Active Force component of the regiment was mobilized for service in the Pacific theatre of operations designated as the 3rd Canadian Infantry Battalion (The West Nova Scotia Regiment), CASF. Following VJ-Day the battalion was disbanded on 1 November 1945.

Post war
Individual members of  the West Nova Scotia Regiment with Canadian Contingents on United Nations and NATO peacekeeping missions in countries such as the former Yugoslavia, Cyprus and the Middle East.

War In Afghanistan
The regiment contributed an aggregate of more than 20% of its authorized strength to the various Task Forces which served in Afghanistan between 2002 and 2014.

Alliances 
 — The Duke of Lancaster's Regiment (King's Lancashire and Border)

Battle honours
In the list below, battle honours in capitals were awarded for participation in large operations and campaigns, while those in lowercase indicate honours granted for more specific battles. Those battle honours followed by a "+" are emblazoned on the regimental colour.

War Of 1812
 Honorary distinction: the non-emblazonable honorary distinction .

The Great War
+
+
Ypres 1917+
+
+
+

Second World War
+
Valguarnera

Catenanuova+
Centuripe

Landing at Reggio
Potenza+
Gambatesa
+
Castel di Sangro
The Gully+

Gustav Line

Hitler Line+
Melfa Crossing
+
+
+
San Martino–San Lorenzo
San Fortunato
Savio Bridgehead

Apeldoorn
+

War in Afghanistan

See also 

Military history of Nova Scotia

Media
 West Novas : A History of the West Nova Scotia Regiment by Thomas H, Raddall (1986)

Notes

References

 Thomas Radall. West Novas: A History of the West Nova Scotia Regiment

External links
Official Website for the West Nova Scotia Regiment

Order of precedence

Infantry regiments of Canada
Military regiments raised in Nova Scotia
Military units and formations established in 1936
Military units and formations of Nova Scotia
Infantry regiments of Canada in World War II